Allium curtum is species of flowering plant in the amaryllis family, Amaryllidaceae. It is native to Cyprus, Egypt, Lebanon, Palestine, the Sinai Peninsula, Syria and Turkey. It is a bulb-forming perennial producing a tight, head-like umbel of green or purple flowers.

Subspecies accepted
Allium curtum subsp. curtum - Egypt incl Sinai, Israel, Palestine, Jordan, Lebanon, Syria, Turkey, Cyprus
Allium curtum subsp. palaestinum Feinbrun - Rafah region in northeastern Sinai

References

curtum
Flora of Cyprus
Flora of Egypt
Flora of Lebanon
Flora of Palestine (region)
Flora of Sinai
Flora of Syria
Flora of Turkey
Plants described in 1859
Taxa named by Pierre Edmond Boissier
Taxa named by Charles Gaillardot